is a Japanese manga series written by Hiroyuki Takei and illustrated by Jet Kusamura. It is a spin-off of the original Shaman King manga by Takei. It was serialized in Kodansha's Shōnen Magazine Edge from June 2018 to January 2020, with its chapters collected in four tankōbon volumes.

Publication
Shaman King: Red Crimson is written by Hiroyuki Takei and illustrated by Jet Kusamura. It was launched in Shōnen Magazine Edge on June 15, 2018. The first tankōbon volume was released on November 15, 2018. After that, Red Crimson went on hiatus between January and May 2019. The manga finished on January 17, 2020, and its fourth and last tankōbon volume was published on March 17, 2020.

In July 2020, Kodansha USA announced the digital English language release of the Shaman Kings spin-offs, and Shaman King: Red Crimson was originally scheduled to be released on August 25, 2020, however, it was delayed to October 27 of the same year. Its four volumes were then released between October 27 and November 24, 2020.

Volume list

References

External links

Kodansha manga
Shaman King
Shōnen manga